Lycée Saint-Joseph is a private high school located in Istanbul, Turkey.  It is a French school founded in 1870. Classes are taught in Turkish, French, and English. Fenerbahçe S.K. was formed by students of this high school.

History
This school was founded by Fran Society (Lasalle Institute). Fran Society (Lasalle Institute) was established by Saint Jean-Baptiste when it first came to Turkey in 1841.

Pensionnat Saint-Joseph, a school for boys, was first established in Pera (now Beyoğlu) in 1857. Its successor Frères des Ecoles Chrétiennes was established in 1860. At one time it moved to a rental property in Moda, Kadıköy but in 1864 it returned to Pera as it could no longer occupy the building, as the owner had sold it to someone else. Sultan Abdulaziz gave permission for the school to build its own building in 1864, but he had to issue another declaration doing the same in 1870 as the original declaration disappeared. 16 August 1870 was the start of construction. It established a  campus in Pera. Accordingly 1870 is listed as the founding year of the school.

The society has since opened schools in Izmir and Istanbul. Currently, Fran Society has 7,225 members, 60,000 teachers, and 785,127 students. They have 1,800 schools in 84 different countries. 
The school has celebrated their 50th anniversary in 1921, 100th in 1971 and 125th in 1996. In 1987, the school began to also admit girls as students.

Notable former students
Calouste Gulbenkian (1869–1955), Armenian business man and philanthropist
Attila Aşkar (born 1944), Turkish civil engineer
Fuat Güner (born 1948), Turkish musician and actor
Enis Batur (born 1952), Turkish poet
Aydemir Güler (born 1961), Turkish communist politician 
Uğur Uluocak (1962–2003), Turkish mountaineer and photographer
Cem Bölükbaşı (born 1998), Turkish racing driver

See also
 List of missionary schools in Turkey
 List of high schools in Turkey
 Education in the Ottoman Empire
 List of schools in the Ottoman Empire

References

External links
 Official website
 Information about St. Joseph High School

High schools in Istanbul
Private schools in Turkey
Educational institutions established in 1870
Kadıköy
1870 establishments in the Ottoman Empire